Hurmaz is a village in Tehsil Mirali, North Waziristan Agency, Pakistan. It is situated in Mirali Town, crossing the Mirali Miranshah Road. There are about 2140 households in the village counted during listings of internally displaced peoples. 150 households were counted during early times. There are four sub-tribes (Khels) living in the village. They are Karhi Khel, Hassan Khel (including Degan), Land, and Nekpi Khel. Mairee and Suleman Khel are the further sub-tribes of Karhi Khel.

The village has fertile land and is irrigated by distributaries and watercourses from Tochi valley. The irrigation system is old and most of the water channels are unlined.

Waziristan
Populated places in North Waziristan